The 1922 VPI Gobblers football team represented Virginia Polytechnic Institute in the 1922 college football season.  The team was led by their head coach B. C. Cubbage and finished with a record of eight wins, one loss and one tie (8–1–1).

Schedule

Players
The following players were members of the 1922 football team according to the roster published in the 1923 edition of The Bugle, the Virginia Tech yearbook.

References

VPI
Virginia Tech Hokies football seasons
VPI Gobblers football